Fouad Abdelmoumni, born in Berkane in 1958, is a human rights activist and Moroccan economist. He is the current secretary-general of Transparency Maroc since 13 February 2016. Also known for his actions in the field of microcredit, he was Director General of the NGO Al Amana from 1997 to 2010.

Early life
Fouad Abdelmoumni was born in 1958 in Berkane in the north-east of Morocco after the independence of 1956. His father, of Oujdie origin, is an official in the Ministry of Justice and will, because of his activism within the 'UNFP, subject to several mutations across the country during his career.

Fouad will thus find himself a pupil in a primary school in Fez and will continue his training at the lycée Moulay Idriss and then in Casablanca to complete his secondary studies in Ibn Toumert and Mohammed V. After obtaining in 1976 a bac in experimental sciences, he Is registered at the Institute of Agricultural and Veterinary Studies of Rabat.

Early human rights activism
Since his 14 years old, he joined the national union of lycées in a clandestine activity. Regarding his political activism, he said, "At the time, in my milieu, one was necessarily republican and revolutionary. Or, it was necessary to accept to remain in withdrawal. ". During his academic year, while the country was in full conflict in the Sahara, and Hassan II, following the green march, confirmed his power and violently repressed his opponents, he was imprisoned for three years.

References

Civil rights activists
1958 births
Living people